Cafard is a 2015 French-Dutch-Belgian animated war film written and directed by Jan Bultheel. The film tells the story of a boxer, Jean Mordant (based on the real-life Henri Herd, known as Constant le Marin), who joins the Belgian Expeditionary Corps which is sent to the Russian Empire during World War I in order to avenge the rape of his daughter by German soldiers in Occupied Belgium.

Voice cast

Release and reception 
The film was theatrically released in Belgium on 23 September 2015, and in France on 12 December. It grossed $20,771 in Belgium, and received positive reviews from critics.

Accolades

References

External links 
Official website (in French; archive)

Cafard at AlloCiné (in French)

Belgian animated films
French animated films
Dutch animated films
2010s French films